The 2015 European Individual Speedway Junior Championship (also known as the 2015 Speedway European Under 21 Championship) was the 18th edition of the Championship.

The final was staged at Silkeborg in Denmark and was won by Anders Thomsen, the fourth rider from Denmark to do so. He held off compatriot Nikolaj Busk Jakobsen to win by one point, with Poland's Bartosz Smektała taking third place.

Final

 30 August 2015
  Silkeborg

See also 
 2015 Speedway European Championship

References

Individual Speedway Junior European Championship
2015 in speedway
2015 in Danish motorsport
International sports competitions hosted by Denmark
Sport in Silkeborg